TBT may refer to:

Arts
 Texas Ballet Theater

Economics
 Technical barriers to trade, a class of non-tariff barriers to trade

Education
 Tampa Bay Technical High School in Tampa, Florida

Media
 tbt*, a free daily tabloid newspaper published by the Tampa Bay Times
 Throwback Thursday or #TBT, a trend among users of social media sites to post or repost older photographs

Music
 Taken by Trees, a Swedish indie pop project from Victoria Bergsman
 Trampled by Turtles, an American bluegrass band
 Twisted Brown Trucker, the band of American singer-songwriter, musician, and rapper Kid Rock
 The Bandito Tour, a world tour by the musical duo Twenty One Pilots

Science
 Tributyltin, a chemical compound

Sports
 The Basketball Tournament, a single-elimination basketball tournament in the United States

Other uses
 Turn-based tactics, video game genre
 Alvis Unipower Tank Bridge Transporter, an engineering vehicle in the British Army
 Tabatinga International Airport IATA code